CGSS may refer to:
Amilcar CGSS, French sporting car
Cedar Girls' Secondary School, Singapore
Command and General Staff School, a military school at Fort Leavenworth, Kansas, U.S.